Tailem Bend (locally, "Tailem") is a rural town in South Australia,  south-east of the state capital of Adelaide. It is located on the lower reaches of the River Murray, near where the river flows into Lake Alexandrina. It is linear in layout since it is constrained by river cliffs on its western side and the Adelaide–Melbourne railway line is dominant on its eastern side. The town grew and consolidated through being a large railway centre between the 1890s and 1990s; now it continues to service regional rural communities.

History 
Prior to European settlement the area was inhabited for millennia by the indigenous Ngarrindjeri people, who made bark and reed canoes and lived on fish and animals dependent on the River Murray. Once written as "Tail'em Bend", the town's name is the Ngarrindjeri word "thelim", meaning "bend", referring to the sharp bend that the river makes in this location. An alternative explanation is that this part of the river was "Thelum Ki", meaning "bent water".

In 1884, while building the railway line eastwards to the colony of Victoria, a track-laying gang set up camp among some native pine trees and named their site "Pine Camp". A township grew from there. In 1887, the year after the railway opened for traffic, "Tailem Bend" was proclaimed.

Industry 
Major industries in the area include pig farming, dairying, and growing grains, hay and olives. The head office of Coorong District Council is situated in the town.

The Tailem Bend railway centre was a large employer for much of the 20th century, providing refuelling, servicing and maintenance facilities for trains on the interstate railway line and rural lines radiating into the Murraylands to the north-east. The steep grades and sharp curves of the Mount Lofty Ranges towards Adelaide required steam locomotives with power at slow speeds; for the relatively straight and flat interstate line to the Victorian border, fast, large-wheeled locomotives were needed. In 1926, expanded facilities were opened, including a large roundhouse, as part of the reforms initiated by the South Australian Railways Commissioner William Webb. Diesel-electric locomotives introduced in the 1950s had wider power and speed ranges, and longer distances between refuelling, reduciing the need for the facilities, and when government ownership of the railways gave way at the turn of the century to private operating companies running non-stop interstate freight trains, most of the facilities were demolished. However, a locomotive and rolling stock reconditioning company operated from the remaining premises.

Transport 
South of the town is the junction between the Princes and Dukes Highways. The Adelaide-Melbourne railway passes through the town but The Overland passenger train and freight trains do not stop. It is, however, a stopping place for interstate bus services. The Tailem Bend Ferry, a cable ferry, operates across the River Murray to Jervois.

From Tailem Bend south-eastwards, the Dukes Highway is a direct route to Melbourne; the Princes Highway runs along the Coorong and coast towards Melbourne, and the Mallee Highway east towards Sydney. There is also a road connecting to the Karoonda Highway leading to Loxton and the Riverland. Tailem Bend is a common stopping point for truck drivers travelling to and/or from Adelaide, as there are no fuel or food outlets with truck facilities on the South Eastern Freeway.

The Bend motorsport park 
Since 2018, when the first Supercars Championship race meeting was held, The Bend Motorsport Park has operated a racing track rated by Formula One winner Mark Webber as world-class. In addition to major events the park offers hot laps, track days, driver experiences and go-karting, and hosts car club events. The OTR SuperSprint is an annual event. The park was the venue of the 25th Australian Scout Jamboree for 11 days in 2019.

Old Tailem Town Pioneer Village 
Old Tailem Town is a privately owned museum that consists of over 110 historical buildings, including corner stores, emporiums, dance halls, hospitals, dentists, chemists, barbers, butchers, bakers, saddlers, clock shops, bootmakers, pubs, stables, police stations, coach and bike shops and the Cobb & Co terminus. It is Australia's largest pioneer village and it depicts the times from 1920 to 1960 in Tailem Bend.

Notable people
Notable people from or who have lived in Tailem Bend include:
 George Jaensch, Northern Territorian telegraph operator and post master, and South Australian farmer and grazier
 David Unaipon, preacher, inventor and author who is featured on the Australian $50 note
 Brooke Krueger 2006 Commonwealth Games gold medallist (women's hammer throw).

Notes

References

See also 
 List of crossings of the Murray River

External links

Towns in South Australia
Populated places on the Murray River